Om al-Nasr or Al-Qaraya al-Badawiya is an area within the northern Gaza governorate in Palestine. The population of the village was about 4,737 according to Palestinian Central Bureau of Statistics (PCBS) in 2017. The village was established in 1997 on an area of 800 dunums.

See also 
Umm al-Nasr Mosque
Muamar family detention incident

References 

North Gaza Governorate